Andrés Ignacio Rebolledo Smitmans (born 17 April 1968) is a Chilean politician and economist. He was a minister during the second government of Michelle Bachelet.

In 2009, Bachelet appointed him as Ambassador of Chile to Uruguay as well as the representative of the country to ALADI. From 2010 to 2014, he was a consultant in the Integration and Trade area of the Inter-American Development Bank (IDB) in Washington DC, United States.

In March 2014, he was appointed as general director of the Direcon during Bachelet's second government. Then, in October 2016 he became Minister of Energy in replacement of Máximo Pacheco Matte.

References

External links
 

1968 births
Living people
University of Chile alumni
Complutense University of Madrid alumni
21st-century Chilean politicians
Socialist Party of Chile politicians